The 1976 Friuli earthquake, also known in Italy as Terremoto del Friuli (Friulian earthquake), occurred on 6 May 1976, with a moment magnitude of 6.5 and a maximum Mercalli intensity of X (Extreme). The shock occurred in the Friuli region in northeast Italy near the town of Gemona del Friuli. 990 people were killed, up to about 3,000 were injured, and more than 157,000 were left homeless.

Earthquake

The quake struck at 21:00:13 (20:00:13 UTC). Seventy-seven villages in the Friuli region were affected. Gemona del Friuli was greatly damaged and despite extensive emergency measures and international aid by the end of 1976 15,000 people were still living in camping trailers, 1,000 in tents and 25,000 in evacuation centres. The damage was estimated at $4.25 million. Much of the town has since been reconstructed. The tremor was felt in Venice, as well as neighbouring Austria, Switzerland and Slovenia (at the time part of Yugoslavia) and Germany. In Slovenia, the upper Soča valley and the Brda area was particularly affected, with the village of Breginj nearly completely demolished. The earthquake damaged several buildings in Nova Gorica and was felt also in the Slovenian capital, Ljubljana.

The Italian Government nominated Chamber of Deputies member Giuseppe Zamberletti as coordinator of aid efforts on behalf of the regional administration. The national funds were assigned to the reconstruction of the damaged buildings by Zamberletti and the regional council of Friuli Venezia Giulia. From September to December 1976 all the earthquake victims were accommodated into prefabricated buildings, in order to better cope with the winter. Many local inhabitants lived in the Government supplied trailers for many years while homes were rebuilt. After Zamberletti's mandate the regional government of Friuli Venezia Giulia was able to completely rebuild many towns, thanks to an accurate resource management, however some towns took over a decade to fully recover. Nowadays, many years after the tragedy, the State's intervention, the earthquake management and reconstruction in Friuli Venezia Giulia are seen as a great example of efficiency and reliability.

Aftershocks
There were many aftershocks, with two sets of strong shocks on 11 September (16:31, 5.5 and 16:35, 5.4 ) and again on 15 September (03:15, 6.0  and 9:21, 5.9 ) 1976.

Aftermath
This event also spurred the foundation of the Protezione Civile (the Italian Civil Defence body that deals with nationwide prevention and management of emergencies and catastrophic events).

See also
List of earthquakes in 1976
List of earthquakes in Italy
List of earthquakes in Slovenia

References

Further reading

External links

1976: More bodies found after Italy quake – BBC

1976 Friuli
1976 Friuli
1976 earthquakes
1976 in Italy
1976 Earthquake
1976 in Yugoslavia
May 1976 events in Europe
1976 disasters in Europe
1976 disasters in Italy